Rafał Jerzy Sznajder (13 October 1972 – 13 April 2014) was a Polish fencer, who competed in the three Summer Olympics: Atlanta 1996, Sydney 2000 and Athens 2004. He won a bronze medal at the 1997 World Fencing Championships and 2001 World Fencing Championships.

After he retired as an athlete, Sznajder took the international referee exams in all three weapons. He officiated several senior World Cups, European Championships, the 2012 Summer Olympics and the 2013 World Fencing Championships. He also served in the Executive Committee of the Polish Fencing Federation. He died suddenly at the end of the 2014 Junior and Cadet World Championships in Plovdiv.

References

External links
 

1972 births
2014 deaths
Polish male fencers
Olympic fencers of Poland
Fencers at the 1996 Summer Olympics
Fencers at the 2000 Summer Olympics
Fencers at the 2004 Summer Olympics
People from Będzin
Sportspeople from Silesian Voivodeship
Universiade medalists in fencing
Universiade bronze medalists for Poland
20th-century Polish people
21st-century Polish people